Completely may refer to:

 Completely (Diamond Rio album)
 Completely (Christian Bautista album), 2005
 "Completely", a song by American singer and songwriter Michael Bolton
 "Completely", a song by Shane Filan from Love Always, 2017
 "Completely", a song by Blue October from This Is What I Live For, 2020

See also
 Completeness (disambiguation)